was a Japanese actor.

Selected filmography

 Ten to sen (1958) - Kiichi Mihara
 Keishichô monogatari: Iryûhin nashi (1959)
 Ôinaru tabiji (1960)
 Ikinuita jûroku-nen: Saigo no Nippon-hei (1960) - Minagawa, Army officer
 Keishichô monogatari: jûni-nin no keiji (1961) - Detective Azuma
 Kanpai! Gokigen yarou (1961)
 Hachi-nin me no teki (1961)
 Jigokû no sokô o buchi yabûre (1962)
 Sanroku (1962)
 Ankoku-gai saigo no hi (1962)
 Miyamoto Musashi: Hannyazaka no kettô (1962) - Fujitsugu Gion
 Minyô no tabi: Akita obako (1963)
 Jûdai no âshidôri (1963)
 Tokubetsu kidô sôsatai (1963) - Aramaki
 Tokubetsu kidô sôsatai: Tokyo eki ni harikome (1963) - Aramaki
 Ankokugai saidai no kettô (1963) - Inspector Ichikawa
 Miyamoto Musashi: Nitôryû kaigen (1963) - Toji - Gion Fujitsugu
 Muhomatsu no issho (1964)
 Zoku zûzûshii yatsu (1964) - Gotô
 Keishichô monogatari: Yukue fumei (1964) - Kitagawa
 Atout coeur à Tokyo pour O.S.S. 117 (1966)
 Chichibu suikoden: kage o kiru ken (1967) - Keijirô Ichinose
 Branded to Kill (1967) - Gihei Kasuga
 Kigeki: Dantai ressha (1967)
 Mighty Jack (1968) - (archive footage)
 Tarekomi (1969)
 Gyakuten ryoko (1969)
 Gendai yakuza: Shinjuku no yotamono (1970)
 Hakurai jingi: Kapone no shatei (1970)
 Yoru no saizensen: Tôkyô maruhi chitai (1971)
 Mekurano Oichi jigokuhada (1972)
 Bodigaado Kiba: Hissatsu sankaku tobi (1973) - Johnny Uchida

References

1928 births
1989 deaths
20th-century Japanese male actors